Peter Baco (born 9 April 1945; Opatová, Lučenec) is a Slovak politician and former Member of the European Parliament with the People's Party – Movement for a Democratic Slovakia, and was therefore a Non-Inscrit in the European Parliament.

He sits on its Committee on Agriculture and Rural Development, and is a substitute for the Committee on Regional Development and a member of the Delegation to the EU-Croatia Joint Parliamentary Committee.

Decorations
 Holder of the Order of Ľudovít Štúr
 FAO Silver Medal
 Departmental award of the Ministry of Agriculture of the Slovak Republic

External links
 
 

1945 births
Living people
People's Party – Movement for a Democratic Slovakia MEPs
MEPs for Slovakia 2004–2009
MEPs for Slovakia 2009–2014
Government ministers of Slovakia
Members of the National Council (Slovakia) 1998-2002